Eastern Orthodoxy in Uganda refers to adherents and religious communities of Eastern Orthodox Christianity in Uganda. Majority of Eastern Orthodox Christians in Uganda are under ecclesiastical jurisdiction of the Eastern Orthodox Patriarchate of Alexandria and all Africa.

Organization

Historically, Uganda was among the first Sub-Saharan countries where Eastern Orthodox Christian communities began to form.
Currently there are nine deaneries which are united into a Metropolis headed by Metropolitan Jonah Lwanga. The headquarters is in Namungoona, a neighborhood of the capital Kampala. The clergy  consists of 77 priests and 5 deacons. There are over 100 communities, some of which have no priests and are run by catechists. There are 41 brick and mortar churches, 17 medical clinics, and the Holy Cross Mission Hospital. Approximately 500,000 Ugandans claim Orthodox baptism.  Many parishes have schools, day and boarding schools. Tuition, accommodation and meals are paid for by parents or by the Church through support of sponsors from outside Uganda. The Church schools are administered by the Church management but follow the Ugandan  Education system as by the Ugandan ministry of Education.  Orthodox students who have been sponsored through the Church, usually return to teach in Church schools, but others also leave to teach at non-Orthodox schools.  One of the more developed parishes is St. Antonios, Monde, near Wobulenzi. Father Antonios Mutyaba is the priest of that parish. At Monde there are a primary and secondary school, a hospital, a church of Saint Anthony the Great, and a female monastery (St. Mary of Egypt) with two sisters. Sister Maria is one of the first four young women who expressed an interest in monasticism in Uganda.

The Russian Orthodox Church also has a mission parish, the Annunciation Orthodox Church on Bukasa Island in Lake Victoria. The parish was founded in 1983, and now is under the spiritual Omophore of Metropolitan Hilarion of ROCOR. Father Christopher Walusimbi is the parish priest. He has taken care of orphans and operates an ambulance service and was instrumental in the establishment of a school and a medical clinic. Both the school and clinic were dedicated to Saint Panteleimon of Nicomedia, but the Ugandan government assumed control and secularized them. The clinic which was started by Fr. Gerasimos in 1983 was abandoned after his expulsion from Uganda in 1988, however the use of aid from the Japanese government finished the clinic. Fr. Christopher planned and built the stone church building which is topped by a multi-colored Russian onion dome.

History
The founders of Orthodoxy in Uganda were four men, one of them Obadia Basajjakitalo. His grandson is Jonah, late Metropolitan of Kampala.

Metropolitan Jonah said: "Some of the Africans were thinking people. They read books on the history of Christianity and found out that Catholics and Protestants are in opposition to each other in the way unsuitable for true Christians. They began to study thoroughly the Bible hoping to find answers to their questions. Once, one of them, an Anglican follower Rebuen Mukasa, encountered in a dictionary the word 'Orthodoxy' and became interested in its meaning. It was called a 'true Church, Mother Church' there. He showed this to his friends and began to seek for further information on Orthodoxy".

This went on in the year 1919. They began to send letters all over the world with the questions on Orthodoxy. One came to a US citizen of African ancestry named George Alexander McGuire. He sent them some literature on his non-canonical "African Orthodox Church". Rebuen Mukasa and his friends then were finally convinced in setting up this religion in Africa. McGuire directed them to a Black Bishop named Daniel William Alexander who lived in South Africa. He came to Uganda and ordained them. Rebuen Mukasa became Father Spartas. But the bishop turned to be an Uniate. This was disclosed later by a Greek businessman.

The friends didn't stop their quest here. Father Spartas and his supporters found a priest from the Ecumenical Patriarchate of Constantinople who traveled through Africa and baptized and chrismated (anointed) Greek children. He came to Uganda and stayed for about 18 months teaching Father Spartas, Irenaeus Magimbi, Theodoros Nankyama and his friends in Orthodox Faith. It was in the beginning of the 1930s. He advised them to place themselves under the  Orthodox Patriarchate of Alexandria in order to be in Canonical Communion. They sent many letters to Alexandria, but there was no answer. In the meantime they baptized people and opened many parishes moving mainly by foot or by bicycles. They gained many followers, but without outside help Father Spartas, and the God loving Orthodox Christians with him, could not manage alone. Eventually they voyaged by foot, by river, by sea, by land until  they arrived in the Alexandrian Patriarchate, where they spent several years being taught what Holy Orthodoxy was, ultimately being ordained and sent back to Uganda.

Canonical Orthodoxy
But later in the year 1946 Orthodox communities of Uganda and Kenya were accepted to join the Patriarchal Throne in full canonical contact. In 1959 in Uganda was sent Bishop Nicholas, Metropolitan of Kampala and the entire East Africa.  From 1959 the Patriarch of Alexandria began to assume spiritual direction for the Orthodox Churches of Africa.

By 1958 for better ruling of Orthodox communities in Eastern Africa the Irinopolis Metropolia was founded with the center in the Tanzanian capital Dar es Salaam, which means "city of peace", in Greek, Irinopolis. The Bishop again ordained Father Spartas and his friends with the accordance to canons of the mother church.

Father Spartas and his friends began to create their church. First four of them converted their relatives to Orthodoxy, and spreading of the faith went further.  Spartas understood that the Church is in need of educated people. He began teaching English language in the school founded by him which was officially private and belonged to the Church. The colonial authorities (Uganda received independence only in 1969), trying to secure its monopoly on education, issued a law directing to teach English only in state schools. That didn't stop Spartas and he was then sent to prison for 5 years.

From 1958, some young Ugandans were sent to Greece and other Orthodox countries, but few of them returned. That became one of the problems. those who returned often conflicted with elder priests.

In 1959 Father Spartas visited Greece. He made speeches to Christians and called for Greeks to come to Africa for catechization and founding of a mission. It resulted in creation of several groups, mostly youth, of prayer and material support.

One of the priests in 1965, while being in the USA, addressed to 75 Greek parishes asking for help. Missionaries in Greece and the USA started to help African Orthodox followers, and still are helping them.

The first of the missionaries was Hieromonk Chrysostom Papasarantopulos,  who came to Uganda in 1960. He served in Africa till his death in December 1972. One of the most prominent missionaries was Stavritsa Zachariou, an American woman of Greek ancestry who arrived in East Africa in 1971. She painted icons and taught Africans the basics of housekeeping.

The help of Greek missionaries was useful, but the principal affairs on apostolic sermon were held by native Africans themselves.

In 1972, in Alexandria for the first time in history three native Ugandans were consecrated Orthodox bishops. One of them was the enlightener of Uganda Spartas Rebuen Mukasa, named the bishop Christophor Nilopolian. He died in 1982 as the prelate of this church.

By this time they joined the Alexandria Patriarchy there were more than 10 thousand followers of Makasa and Basadjikitalo in Uganda. There is no statistics on this, and exact numbers can hardly be known. Some sources state that in the beginning of 90s there were more than 200 thousand, and in 2004 there were about 1.5 million of Orthodox Christians in Africa.

Starting from 1995, the first African became Metropolitan- the Metropolitan of Kampala and all Uganda Theodoros Nankyama. Archbishop Theodoros contributed greatly to the liturgical teaching and development of the Ugandan Church and was beloved by many.

Apart from evangelizing and catechizing people in the Orthodox faith, Bishop Theodoros also had a dream of offering education to the Ugandan children as much as possible, irrespective of gender. In Uganda as also generally in Africa, the girl child education was not a matter taken importantly or given much attention. He always believed that mothers play a big role in the raising of the children’s personality, something that makes it very vital to educate the girl child, equipping her with the qualities to raise the children both in good morals and Christian faith but also in general knowledge. For this he is remembered for having offered many scholarships to male children but also to many girl children. By it time of his death in 1997, his efforts of women education, together with those of the Ugandan government and others, had brought forth many fruits, in that Uganda had acquired the first ever woman Vice President, who actually represented the President (who happened to be out of the nation) at the Bishop’s funeral ceremony. From 1997, Theodoros was followed by Jonah, grandson of Obadias Basajjakitalo. Under Metropolitan Jonah, the Church has experienced different developments through the years, more parishes opened, more churches built, more priests ordained for the growing mission, and the Church administration organised more with the creation of 9 deaneries.

As a result of continuous spiritual and physical growth of the Church in Uganda, on the 26th of November 2018, the Holy Synod of the Patriarchate of Alexandria and All Africa, headed by the Patriarch Theodore II of Alexandria, created a new Diocese for North and Eastern Uganda, electing Bishop Silvestros (Maxmos kisitu) as first bishop of the New Diocese of Gulu and Eastern Uganda.

See also
 Eastern Orthodox Patriarchate of Alexandria
 Chrysostomos Papasarantopoulos
 Jonah (Lwanga) of Kampala
 George Alexander McGuire
 African Orthodox Church (non-canonical)
 Raphael Morgan

References
 The original article is based on a translated Russian article Православие в Уганде, where sources for the data are stated.

Further reading
 Metropolitan Makarios (Tillyrides). Adventures in the Unseen. Orthodox Research Institute, 2004. 548 pp. 
 Metropolitan Makarios (Tillyrides). The Origin of Orthodoxy in East Africa. Orthodox Research Institute.